Orleir Messias Camel  (16 March 1949 - 8 May 2013) was a Brazilian politician and businessman who held the office Governor of Acre from 1995 to 1999.

Born in Cruzeiro do Sul, he later became the mayor between 1993 and 1994.

At the time of his election as Governor of Acre, he was affiliated with the Progressive Reform Party.

He is the uncle of Brazilian politician and engineer Gladson Cameli.

References 

1949 births
2013 deaths
Governors of Acre (state)
20th-century Brazilian businesspeople